The 1974–75 Cypriot Cup was the 33rd edition of the Cypriot Cup. A total of 16 clubs entered the competition. It began on 28 May 1975 with the first round and concluded on 6 July 1975 with the final which was held at GSP Stadium. Anorthosis Famagusta won their 6th Cypriot Cup trophy after beating Enosis Neon Paralimni 3–2 in the final.

Format 
Due to the Turkish invasion participation was limited to the 14 Cypriot First Division teams, the champion team of the 1974–75 Special mixed championship Second–Third Division and APOEL. APOEL participated unofficially in the 1974–75 Cypriot First Division, and their matches did not count towards the official league table.

The competition consisted of four knock-out rounds. In all rounds each tie was played as a single leg and was held at the home ground of the one of the two teams, according to the draw results. Each tie winner was qualifying to the next round. If a match was drawn, extra time was following. If extra time was drawn, there was a replay at the ground of the team who were away for the first game. If the rematch was also drawn, then extra time was following and if the match remained drawn after extra time the winner was decided by penalty shoot-out.

The cup winner secured a place in the 1975–76 European Cup Winners' Cup.

First round 
8 clubs from the 1976–77 Cypriot First Division, 7 clubs from the 1976–77 Cypriot Second Division and 7 clubs from the 1976–77 Cypriot Third Division were added.

Quarter-finals

Semi-finals

Final

Sources

Bibliography

See also 
 Cypriot Cup
 1974–75 Cypriot First Division

Cypriot Cup seasons
1974–75 domestic association football cups
1974–75 in Cypriot football